At around 8 p.m. JST on 31 October 2021, a man, 24-year-old Kyota Hattori carried out a knife and arson attack on a Keiō Railway train as it was travelling to Kokuryō Station on the Keiō Line in Chōfu, a city in the western suburbs of Tokyo, Japan. He injured 17 people, one critically. Japanese authorities later identified Hattori and he was arrested at the scene.

Hattori stated that he was referring to the Tokyo stabbings, which occurred on 6 August 2021. In response to these incidents, MLIT has decided to require railroad operators to install security cameras in all new trains.

Incident 
The attack began as Hattori reportedly sprayed pesticide into the eyes of the man sitting next to him on the train, before stabbing him in the chest. He then moved to another car and spread lighter fluid across the car in order to start a fire. Some of the passengers thought the attacker was part of a Halloween stunt, until other passengers began fleeing and Hattori began waving a long bloody knife.

As the Special Express train passed through Fuda Station, one of the passengers pressed the emergency alarm; in response, the train planned to make an emergency stop at Kokuryō Station. While the train was approaching Kokuryō Station, the emergency door release handle was pulled, causing the train to stop  to  before its proper parking position. As the train was coming to a stop, footage recorded by a passenger showed other passengers fleeing to one end of the train as the fire ignited by the attacker erupted in one of the cars. After the train had come to a stop, passengers opened the train's windows and climbed out to escape.

Suspect 
After being arrested, the 24-year-old suspect was identified as Kyota Hattori. He allegedly told officers that he wanted to die after having work problems in June of 2021 and that he was no longer getting along with his friends. He allegedly stated that if he had killed at least two people, he would receive the death penalty.

Several media outlets noted that the man was dressed in clothing that appeared similar to that of the Joker character from the Batman franchise.

Attempted recreation 
Eight days later on 8 November 2021, a 69-year old man from Fukuoka attempted to set a Sakura Shinkansen service on fire. Although no casualties were reported, the man claimed that the motive of the attack was to replicate the attacks done in Tokyo the week before. The perpetrator was then arrested after the train made an emergency stop at Shin-Yatsushiro Station.

See also
August 2021 Tokyo stabbings
Akihabara massacre
Kawasaki stabbings
Osaka school massacre
Sagamihara stabbings
Suicidal ideation
Tokyo subway sarin attack

References

2021 crimes in Japan
2021 fires in Asia
2021 in Tokyo
Arson in Japan
Arson in the 2020s
Chōfu, Tokyo
Crime in Tokyo
Halloween events
Knife attacks
October 2021 crimes in Asia
October 2021 events in Japan
Stabbing attacks in 2021

Terrorist incidents in Tokyo
Train and rapid transit fires